Alba is a Spanish surname. Notable people with the surname include:

Benny Alba (born 1949), American artist
Elia Alba (born 1962), Dominican-American visual artist
Enrique Alba (born 1968), Spanish computer scientist
Gibson Alba (born 1960), Dominican Republic baseball player
Jessica Alba (born 1981), American actress
Jordi Alba (born 1989), Spanish footballer
Julia Alba (born 1972), Spanish sprinter
Luis Larrea Alba (1895–1980), President of Ecuador in 1931
Macrino d'Alba (c. 1460–c. 1510), Italian painter
Maria Alba (1910–1999), artistic name of Spanish-American film actress
Miguel Alba (born 1988), Argentine footballer
Panchito Alba (1925–1995), artistic name of a Filipino film actor
R.D. Alba (born 1978), Filipino film and television director
Rogaciano Alba, Mexican farmer
Samuel Alba (born 1947), American judge
Sara Alba (born 1968), Spanish politician
Unai Alba (born 1978), Spanish footballer
Víctor Alba (1916–2003), Spanish politician, journalist, writer and university professor
Karl "Dyzee" Alba (born 1979), Canadian born Filipino, world champion professional B-Boy (break dancer)

See also
House of Alba, an important aristocratic family of Spanish origin
List of Dukes of Alba, Spanish nobility of the House of Alba

References

Spanish-language surnames